The 14511/14512 Nauchandi Express is an express train belonging to Indian Railways that runs between Prayagraj Sangam railway station and Saharanpur Junction in India.

It operates as train number 14511 from Prayagraj Sangam station(station code: PYGS) to Saharanpur Junction and as train number 14512 in the reverse direction.

It is named after the Nauchandi Temple in Meerut. Earlier this train used to run from Allahabad Junction to Meerut City Junction and then later extended to Saharanpur Junction. Now it runs from Prayagraj Sangam station to Saharanpur Junction. The train 14511 has 20 coaches, 14 of which terminate in Meerut City Junction and 6 coaches continue towards Saharanpur Junction. 14512 starts from Saharanpur Junction as a 6 coach train and then combines with the 14 coach train (also train numbered 14512) standing in Meerut City Junction.

Coaches

The 14511/14512 Nauchandi Express presently has 1 AC 2 tier, 1 AC 3 tier, 1 AC 1 cum AC 2 tier, 10 Sleeper Class & 8 General Unreserved coaches.

As with most train services in India, Coach Composition may be amended at the discretion of Indian Railways depending on demand.

Slip coaches of 54402/05 Khurja Passenger are attached/detached at Hapur.

Service

The 14511 Nauchandi Express covers the distance of 774 kilometres in 18 hours 10 mins (42.61 km/hr) & in 17 hours 55 mins as 14512 Nauchandi Express (45.09 km/hr).

Traction

It is hauled end to end by a WDM 3A engine from the Lucknow shed.

Timetable

14511 Nauchandi Express leaves Prayagraj Sangam railway station every day at 17:20 hrs IST and reaches Saharanpur Junction at 10:50 hrs IST the next day.

14512 Nauchandi Express leaves Saharanpur Junction every day at 17:25 hrs IST and reaches Prayagraj Sangam railway station at 10:20 hrs IST the next day.

External links

References 

Transport in Saharanpur
Trains from Allahabad
Named passenger trains of India
Express trains in India